Bajrović is a Bosnian patronymic surname derived from the given name Bajro. Notable people include:

 Admir Bajrovic (born 1995), Swedish footballer
 Izudin Bajrović (born 1963), Bosnian actor
 Nedžad Bajrović (born 1970), Bosnian footballer
 Reuf Bajrović (born 1977), Bosnian-American politician

Bosnian surnames
Patronymic surnames